"Touch Me With Your Love" is a song by Beth Orton, released as the fourth single from 1996 album Trailer Park. It contains 4 songs, and was released on C.D. and vinyl. The release peaked at #60 in the UK official singles chart. It was also released in Australia with a different track listing, and was Orton's first release to have a promotional video.

Track listing

CD: Heavenly / HVN 64CD United Kingdom 
"Touch Me With Your Love" - 7:27
"Pedestal" - 4:58
"Galaxy of Emptiness (Live At Shepards Bush Empire 1996-11-26)" - 5:52
"Touch Me With Your Love (instrumental)" - 6:37

CD: Deconstruction / 74321 453 612 Australia 
"Touch Me With Your Love (Radio Edit)" - 4:02
"Touch Me With Your Love (Video Edit)" - 4:49
"Pedestal" - 4:58
"Galaxy of Emptiness (Live At Shepards Bush Empire 1996-11-26)" - 5:52

Beth Orton songs
1996 singles
1996 songs
Heavenly Recordings singles
Songs written by Beth Orton